Hernando de Arias y Ugarte (September 9, 1561 – January 27, 1638) was a Spanish Neogranadine Roman Catholic prelate who served as Archbishop of Lima (1628–1638), Archbishop of La Plata o Charcas (1624–1628), Archbishop of Santafé en Nueva Granada (1616–1625), and Bishop of Quito (1613–1616).

Biography
Hernando de Arias y Ugarte was born in Bogota. On April 22, 1613, Pope Paul V, appointed him Bishop of Quito. On September 28, 1614, he was consecrated bishop by Bartolomé Lobo Guerrero, Archbishop of Lima. On March 14, 1616, Pope Paul V, appointed him Archbishop of Santafé en Nueva Granada. On April 15, 1624, Pope Urban VIII, appointed him Bishop of La Plata o Charcas. On March 4, 1628, Pope Urban VIII appointed him Archbishop of Lima where he served until his death on January 27, 1638.

Episcopal succession
While bishop, he was the principal consecrator of:
Leonel de Cervantes y Caravajal, Bishop of Santa Marta; 
Feliciano de la Vega Padilla, Bishop of Popayán; 
Melchor Maldonado y Saavedra, Bishop of Córdoba; 
Pedro de Villagómez Vivanco, Bishop of Arequipa; and 
Francisco de la Serna, Bishop of Paraguay.

References

External links and additional sources
 (for Chronology of Bishops) 
 (for Chronology of Bishops) 
 (for Chronology of Bishops) 
 (for Chronology of Bishops) 
 (for Chronology of Bishops) 
 (for Chronology of Bishops) 
 (for Chronology of Bishops) 
 (for Chronology of Bishops) 

1561 births
1638 deaths
Bishops appointed by Pope Urban VIII
Bishops appointed by Pope Paul V
University of Salamanca alumni
University of Lleida alumni
Roman Catholic archbishops of Lima
Roman Catholic archbishops of Bogotá
17th-century Roman Catholic bishops in Ecuador
17th-century Roman Catholic bishops in Peru
17th-century Roman Catholic bishops in Bolivia
17th-century Roman Catholic bishops in New Granada
Roman Catholic bishops of Quito
Roman Catholic archbishops of Sucre